Abziri also known variously as Abziritanus and Abdiritanus was a Roman and Byzantine era oppidum (town) in Africa Proconsularis, Roman North Africa. The town is tentatively identified with ruins near Oudna, in Cartagine, Tunisia.

History
The town was mentioned by Pliny and was one of the 30 oppida libera in Africa Proconsularis. The town appears to be a native Berber town associated with the nearby Roman colony of Uthina.

Bishopric
The town was the seat of an ancient Catholic bishopric which functioned till the end of the 7th century and the arrival of Islamic Armies. The diocese was refounded in name in 1933, and exists today as a titular see in the Roman Catholic Church.   
 Victor (Catholic Bishop) fl. 390
 Fructuosus Abziritanus fl. 411
 Emilio Abascal y Salmerón (Mexico)   July 25, 1953 – April 18, 1968  
 Giuseppe Obert (Bangladesh)   September 5, 1968 – March 6, 1972  
 Vinzenz Guggenberger (Germany)   May 17, 1972 – July 4, 2012  
 Kęstutis Kėvalas  (Lithuania)   September 27, 2012
  (Austria)   May 31, 2017

References

Ancient Berber cities
Roman towns and cities in Africa (Roman province)
Catholic titular sees in Africa